Grand Casino was a riverboat casino and hotel in Biloxi, Mississippi, United States. It was owned and operated by Harrah's Entertainment.  Prior to its destruction by Hurricane Katrina, the casino had two hotels with a total of 1,000 rooms, and a  casino.

History
The property was opened by Grand Casinos in May 1993. An expansion was completed in 1999, adding 594 hotel rooms and a spa and salon.

During 2005, Grand Casino Gulfport was a Caesars Entertainment property. After the ownership changed to Harrah's Entertainment, the company announced that this casino would be converted to the Harrah's brand. But before that could take place, the property was destroyed by Hurricane Katrina. While most of the hotel facility remained intact, the casino barge was washed ashore during the hurricane and partially blocked Beach Boulevard (U.S. Highway 90), the beach front's main roadway. In an effort to clear the road, the casino was imploded on September 21, 2005.

In December 2005, Harrah's announced that the site and any remaining assets were being sold to Gulfside Casino Partnership, the owners of the adjacent Copa Casino, the Grand's neighboring competitor whose own casino barge was swept into the Grand's parking lot by Katrina. The Copa Casino Gulfport, which had been located in a berth at the Mississippi State Docks, purchased the Grand site for its own post-Katrina expansion plans. The Skybridge and/or Catwalk redirects to a parking lot and you can go to the hotel. The casino is now called the Island View Casino.

References

Defunct casinos in the United States
Hotels in Mississippi
Casinos in Mississippi
Buildings and structures in Gulfport, Mississippi
Towers in Mississippi
Defunct riverboat casinos
1993 establishments in Mississippi
Casinos completed in 1993
2005 disestablishments in Mississippi
Hotels established in 1993